Führerhauptquartier Wolfsschlucht I (Wolf's Gorge) was the codename for one of Adolf Hitler's military headquarters, located in a farmhouse of the Belgian village of Brûly-de-Pesche, in the municipality of Couvin, close to the French border. It was occupied by Hitler between 6–24 June 1940 while awaiting the conclusion of the Battle of France.

References

External links
 Remnants of Wolfsschlucht I

Buildings and structures in Namur (province)
World War II sites of Nazi Germany
Fuehrer Headquarters
World War II sites in Belgium
German occupation of Belgium during World War II
1940 in Belgium